This is a list of Tax Ministers of Denmark since 1975. The collection of taxes was originally assumed by the Finance Ministry. The Finance Ministry's Department of Taxes and Customs (Skatte- og Tolddepartementet) was elevated to the rank of an independent ministry on 13 February 1975. It has officially been referred to as the Tax Ministry (Skatteministeriet) since 10 September 1987.

List of Tax Ministers

Sources
The Danish Tax Ministry
Lists of Danish governments since 1848

Tax Ministers